Gadhinglaj is a taluka in Maharashtra. The city of Gadhinglaj is the taluka headquarters and Gadhinglaj subdivision headquarters as well. As of 2011, the taluka had a population of 874,015, of which 35% were urban. Languages spoken in this area are Marathi, Kannada, Hindi and English also. But the most-spoken language is Marathi, as Marathi is a state language.

Geography

Gadhinglaj

Gadhinglaj is a city and municipality in the Gadhinglaj Taluka, a subdivision of the Kolhapur district, state of Maharashtra, India. It is the headquarters of the taluka.

It shares with most of the cities in Maharashtra that the main language spoken is Marathi. Gadhinglaj is situated on the banks of the river Hiranyakeshi. In 2011 its population was 79,997; it is the third largest city in Kolhapur District.

It has an average elevation of 623 metres (2043 feet).

It is at the border of Maharashtra and Karnataka. It is a growing city in terms of population and economy. The majority of people are Hindu, very few Muslims and a small number of other religions.

Kadgaon

Kadgaon is a Town situated Gadhinglaj Taluka of Kolhapur district situated in the southwest corner of state Maharashtra, India. Kadgaon is about 4 km from Gadhinglaj, 79 km from Kolhapur and about 15 km from National Highway 48 (NH48). It is managed by Town Council. It is in the phase of transforming from a small town to a bustling city. It is the second largest city after Gadhinglaj in Gadhinglaj Taluka also second largest city in Gadhinglaj sub division which include talukas of Gadhinglaj, Ajra, Bhudargad, Chandgad.

As of 2012 it has a population of about 20,851. Kadgaon has an amenities that are of the Level of Municipal Council in India. Kadgaon has  developed as an industrial hub in recent years. It has a strong agricultural sector and is known for its sugarcane, jaggery and red chili production.

It has an average elevation of 627 metres (2043 feet).

It has an average weather of clear sky and temperature of around 15 °C in winter and 24 °C in summer and has more rainfall than average in Kolhapur District. It is a town near at the border of Maharashtra and Karnataka. It is well connected to all of Kolhapur and Maharashtra. It has a very excellent civic amenities. As is usual in  Maharashtra the primary language spoken is Marathi with 20,851 speaking as their primary language.

Nesari

Nesari is a town in Gadhinglaj Taluka of Kolhapur district in Maharashtra, India. In 2001 it had a population of 15,299, but as of 2011 it has population of 20,249. It is a major market place and third largest settlement in Gadhinglaj taluka. Nesari is about 22 km from Gadhinglaj, 24 kmm from the second largest settlement Kadgaon and 19 km from National Highway 48 (NH48). Nesari is a city in India, near the border of Maharashtra and Karnataka, co-ordinates . It has an average elevation of 1,599 metres. It has an average temperature of 19 °C in winter and 26 °C in summer.

Mahagaon,Gadhinglaj

Mahagaon is a Town in Gadhinglaj Taluka Kolhapur district situated in the southwest corner of the state Maharashtra, India. Mahagaon is situated on banks of Hiranyakeshi river originated from the Great Amboli Ghats is about 10 km from Gadhinglaj towards south and 14 km from the second-largest city Kadgaon in Gadhinglaj Taluka.

It has an average elevation of 624 metres (2043 feet).

It is situated on banks of Hiranyakeshi river originated from the Great Amboli Ghats. Mahagaon has an average Weather of clear sky and temperature of around 18 °C in winter and 25 °C in summer and has more rainfall than average in Kolhapur District. 
It is a town near at the border of Maharashtra and Karnataka. It is managed by Town Council. In 2011 it has a population of about 20,108. Mahagaon is fourth-largest city in Gadhinglaj Taluka. It is a major town and educational center in South Maharashtra.

Harali

Harali is a Town in Gadhinglaj Taluka Kolhapur district situated in the southwest corner of state Maharashtra, India. Harali is situated on banks of Hiranyakeshi river originated from the Great Amboli Ghats  is about 7 km from Gadhinglaj towards south and 12 km from the second-largest city Kadgaon in Gadhinglaj Taluka and just 2 km from Mahagaon, Gadhinglaj. It is managed by Town Council. In 2011 it has a population of about 15,856. Harali is eight largest city and town in Gadhinglaj Taluka. Shri Appasaheb Nalawade Gadhinglaj Taluka Sahakari Sakhar Karkhana (sugar mills) is situated in the Town.

It has an average elevation of 624 metres (2043 feet).

It is situated on banks of Hiranyakeshi river originated from the Great Amboli Ghats. Mahagaon has an average weather of clear sky and temperature of around 19 °C in winter and 27 °C in summer and has more rainfall than average in Kolhapur District.

Mungurwadi

Mungurwadi is a town in Gadhinglaj Taluka of the Kolhapur district, state of Maharashtra, India. In 2001 it had a population of 3,271, but as of 2011, it has population of 12,199. It is a major market place and tenth largest settlement in Gadhinglaj taluka.

It has an average elevation of 1,979  metres. It is a town near the border of Maharashtra and Karnataka. As the town lies on a hill, its climate is always cold with temperatures ranging from 27 °C to 19 °C in summer and 24 °C to 15 °C in winter. It is one of the most densely forested areas in Kolhapur.

List of largest settlement in Gadhinglaj Taluka

References

Cities and towns in Kolhapur district
Talukas in Maharashtra